Blackpool Electric Tramway Company  operated a tramway service in Blackpool between 1885 and 1893. It was the first electric tramway in England.

History

On 3 December 1884, Blackpool Corporation agreed to use Michael Holroyd Smith's conduit tramway and granted him a seven-year concession.

The Blackpool Electric Tramway Company was formed in January 1885, and set up with capital of £30,000 (equivalent to £ in ).  The first rail was laid in March and the first test runs were made on 29 June. The tramway was officially opened on 29 September 1885. The Chairman of the company was Alderman Richard Horsfall. The location caused many problems for the conduit system and the company employed horses to pull trams when the track was flooded.

With further extensions, the line ran from Cocker Street to Dean Street near South Pier and from Manchester Square along Lytham Road.

The tramway was a financial success. In 1890 the profits of the year were £2,983 (equivalent to £ in ), out of which a dividend of 7 per cent was paid.

Closure

When the lease expired, the Corporation took over the tramway on 18 September 1893, and it continued as Blackpool Corporation Tramway. The Blackpool Electric Tramway Company was wound up.

Car 4 survived and is preserved at the National Tramway Museum.

References

Tram transport in England
Transport companies established in 1885
Transport in Blackpool
History of Blackpool
Historic transport in Lancashire